Marcia Ball (born March 20, 1949, Orange, Texas, United States) is an American blues singer and pianist raised in Vinton, Louisiana.

Ball was described in USA Today as "a sensation, saucy singer and superb pianist... where Texas stomp-rock and Louisiana blues-swamp meet." The Boston Globe described her music as "an irresistible celebratory blend of rollicking, two-fisted New Orleans piano, Louisiana swamp rock and smoldering Texas blues from a contemporary storyteller."

Career
Ball was born into a musical family. Her grandmother and aunt both played piano music of their time and Ball started piano lessons when she started school, and showed an early interest in New Orleans style piano playing, as exemplified by Fats Domino, Professor Longhair, and James Booker. She has named Irma Thomas, the New Orleans vocalist, as her chief vocal inspiration. Ball studied English at Louisiana State University in the 1960s while playing in a band called Gum. In 1970, at age 21, she started a progressive country band called Freda and the Firedogs in Austin, Texas, and began her solo career in 1974.

Ball's piano style includes elements of zydeco, swamp blues, Louisiana blues, and boogie woogie. She began her recording career as a solo artist with Rounder Records in the 1980s and early 1990s. In 2001, she joined the Chicago-based Alligator Records. Her Rounder album, Sing It!, which featured vocalists Irma Thomas and Tracy Nelson, released in January 1998 was nominated for a Grammy Award and a Blues Music Award for "Best Contemporary Blues Album." Ball received the 1998 Blues Music Award for "Contemporary Female Vocalist of the Year" and "Best Blues Instrumentalist-Keyboards."

She was awarded "Contemporary Blues Album of the Year" for her albums Presumed Innocent (2002) and So Many Rivers (2004). The same year she also won "Contemporary Blues Artist of the Year-Female." She won the "Best Blues Instrumentalist-Keyboards" again in 2005, 2006, 2007, and 2009. The BMA for Keyboards has since been renamed the Pinetop Perkins Piano Player Award and Ball has won it in 2012 and 2015. Her 2003 Alligator release, So Many Rivers, was nominated for a Grammy as were Live! Down The Road (2005) and Peace, Love & BBQ (2008). She was inducted into the Austin Music Hall of Fame in 2018.

Ball has continued to work with Irma Thomas. In 2006, the two contributed a duet ("Look Up") on the New Orleans Social Club release, Sing Me Back Home (Burgundy Records/Honey Darling Records). In 2007, the two contributed another duet ("I Can't Get New Orleans Off My Mind") to Goin' Home: A Tribute to Fats Domino (Vanguard Records). She continues to play at nightclubs, particularly in Austin and New Orleans, and performs at music festivals in North America and overseas.

In May 2015, Ball won the 'Pinetop Perkins Piano Player' award at the Blues Music Awards ceremony. She won the same award in 2019.

On October 25, 2018, Ball was inducted into the Austin City Limits Hall of Fame, where she first appeared during their inaugural season in 1976.

Discography

Solo or principal artist
1972: Freda and the Firedogs
1978: Circuit Queen (Capitol)
1984: Soulful Dress (Rounder)
1985: Hot Tamale Baby (Rounder)
1989: Gatorhythms (Rounder)
1990: Dreams Come True (Antone's) (with Lou Ann Barton and Angela Strehli)
1994: Blue House (Rounder)
1997: Let Me Play With Your Poodle (Rounder)
1998: Sing It! (Rounder) (with Tracy Nelson and Irma Thomas)
2001: Presumed Innocent (Alligator Records)
2003: So Many Rivers (Alligator)
2004: Live at Waterloo Records (Alligator)
2005: Live! Down The Road (Alligator)
2007: JazzFest Live (MunckMusic\Munck)
2008: Peace, Love & BBQ (Alligator)
2011: Roadside Attractions (Alligator)
2014: The Tattooed Lady & The Alligator Man (Alligator)
2018: Shine Bright (Alligator)

Other contributions
 2000 Don Wise: In the verge of survival, with Delbert McClinton
2003: Patchwork: A Tribute to James Booker (STR Digital Records)
2006: Sing Me Back Home New Orleans Social Club (Burgundy Records/Honey Darling Records) Duet with Irma Thomas, "Look Up".
2007: Goin' Home: A Tribute to Fats Domino (Vanguard Records) Duet with Irma Thomas, "I Can't Get New Orleans Off My Mind".
2009: Dave Alvin and the Guilty Women (Yep Roc Records) With Dave Alvin. Member of "The Guilty Women" band.

Filmography
2003: The Blues, episode Piano Blues directed by Clint Eastwood
2006: New Orleans Music in Exile

Festival appearances

San Francisco Blues Festival – 1984
Austin Aqua Fest – 1986
Long Beach Blues Festival – 1996
Rhythm And Roots Festival (Charlestown, Rhode Island) – 2000, 2001, 2003, 2005, 2006, 2008, 2010, 2011, 2013, 2015, 2017
Thursday at the Square – 2002
Monterey Jazz Festival – 2002
Austin City Limits Music Festival – 2004
National Folk Festival (USA) – 2005
Waterfront Blues Festival (Portland, Oregon) – 2007
New Orleans Jazz and Heritage Festival – 2004, 2007, 2008, 2009, 2014, 2015, 2018
Arkansas Blues and Heritage Festival (Helena, Arkansas) – 2010
Crescent City Blues and BBQ Festival (New Orleans, Louisiana) – 2011
Chicago Blues Festival – 2013
Edmonton Blues Festival - 2018

See also
List of blues musicians
List of boogie woogie musicians
List of Louisiana blues musicians
List of Swamp blues musicians
List of people from Texas
List of Austinites
Music of Austin
Lake Eden Arts Festival

References

External links

 Official Marcia Ball website
 
Marcia Ball at Facebook
 Fan site
 Le Show interview: 

1949 births
Living people
People from Vinton, Louisiana
Louisiana blues musicians
Singers from Louisiana
American blues singers
American blues pianists
Swamp blues musicians
20th-century American women pianists
20th-century American pianists
20th-century American women singers
21st-century American women singers
21st-century American women pianists
21st-century American pianists
Musicians from Austin, Texas
Alligator Records artists
20th-century American singers